Émile Gamard (15 July 1911 – 10 January 2004) was a French racing cyclist. He rode in the 1937 Tour de France.

References

1911 births
2004 deaths
French male cyclists
Place of birth missing